In Japan, the Imperial Guard is the name for two separate organizations dedicated to the protection of the Emperor of Japan and the Imperial Family, palaces and other imperial properties.

Imperial Guard of the Imperial Japanese Army

The Imperial Guard of the Imperial Japanese Army was formed in 1867. It became the foundation of the Imperial Japanese Army after the Emperor Meiji assumed all the powers of state during the Meiji Restoration. The Imperial Guard, which consisted of 12,000 men organized and trained along French military lines, first saw action in the Satsuma Rebellion. It was organized into the 1st Guards Infantry Brigade which had the 1st and 2nd Regiments. The 3rd and 4th Regiments belonged to the 2nd Guards Infantry Brigade.

By 1885 the Imperial Japanese Army consisted of seven divisions, one of which was the Imperial Guard. A division consisted of four regiments containing an HQ and two battalions each. The Imperial Guard division was based in Tokyo and was recruited on national lines, officers were also drawn nationally.

After the Russo-Japanese War in 1905, a second Guard Brigade was formed from indigenous Formosans.  In 1920 the Guards Cavalry Regiment, Guards Field Artillery Regiment, Guards Engineer Battalion, and Guards Transport Battalion, plus other Guards service units were raised, adding to the overall ORBAT of the force.

From 1937 to 1939 the Guards Engineer Battalion was expanded into a regiment as was the Guards Transport Battalion.

Pacific War
In September 1939, the division was split into the 1st and 2nd Guards Brigades.

The 1st Guards Brigade, which contained the 1st and 2nd Guards Infantry Regiments, the cavalry regiment, and half of the support units, was transferred to South China. Here it became known as the Mixed Guards Brigade. In October 1940, it joined other Japanese units occupying French Indo-China.  In April 1941 the Mixed Guards Brigade returned to Tokyo but it did not rejoin the Imperial Guards Division.

The 2nd Guards Brigade, which contained 3rd and 4th Guards Regiments, also went to China. In 1940, it went to Shanghai before being posted to Hainan Island. In June 1941, the 5th Guards Infantry Regiment joined the 2nd Guards Brigade becoming the Imperial Guard Division again. It later saw action in the Battles of Malaya and  Singapore with Tomoyuki Yamashita's 25th Army.

In May 1943, all designated Imperial Guard units were renamed again. The Mixed Guards Brigade in Tokyo became the 1st Guards Division (which now consisted of the 1st, 2nd, 6th Guard Regiments) and the Imperial Guard Division became the 2nd Guards Division. The 3rd Guards Division, which never left Japan, was formed in 1944.  It consisted of the 8th, 9th and 10th Guards Regiments. Sources do not agree if there ever was a 7th Guard Regiment.

All military Imperial Guard Divisions were dissolved at the end of World War II.

War crimes
In Malaya and Singapore, the Guard Division was involved in several notorious Japanese war crimes such as the Parit Sulong Massacre and the Sook Ching massacre. Lt Gen. Takuma Nishimura, who was sentenced to life imprisonment by a British military court in relation to the Sook Ching killings, was later convicted of war crimes by an Australian Military Court in relation to the Parit Sulong massacre. He was executed by hanging on June 11, 1951.

Organization
  1st Guards Division (近衛第1師団, Konoe Dai-ichi Shidan)
 2nd Guards Division (近衛第2師団, Konoe Dai-ni Shidan)
 3rd Guards Division (近衛第3師団, Konoe Dai-san Shidan)

Uniform

Until 1939, the Cavalry of the Imperial Guard wore a French style parade uniform consisting of a dark-blue tunic with red Brandenburg braiding, a red kepi and red breeches. The red kepi had a white plume with a red base.  Prior to the general adoption of khaki by the Japanese Army during the Russo-Japanese War (1904-1905), an all white linen uniform had been worn in hot weather.

The Infantry of the Imperial Guard wore a dark blue uniform with white leggings for both parade and service wear until 1905.  It was distinguished from that of the line infantry by a red band and piping on the peaked service cap (instead of yellow).  Officers wore a dark blue tunic with 5 rows of black mohair froggings and dark blue breeches with a red stripe down each seam.

Following the adoption of a khaki service dress, the Guard Infantry wore this on all occasions, although officers retained the blue and red uniform for certain ceremonial occasions when not parading with troops.

In the field, the army's standard khaki uniform was worn by all Imperial Guard units from 1905 to 1945. Guard units were distinguished by a wreathed star in bronze worn on the headgear, in contrast to the plain five pointed star worn by other units.

Gallery

Imperial Guard of the National Police Agency   

With the total reconstruction of the Japanese police systems in 1954, it became a part of the National Police Agency.

At present, it consists of over 900 security police personnel who provide personal security for the Emperor, Crown Prince and other members of the Imperial Family, as well as protection of imperial properties, including the Tokyo Imperial Palace, Kyoto Imperial Palace, Katsura Imperial Villa, Shugakuin Imperial Villa (both in Kyoto), Shosoin Imperial Repository in Nara, as well as Hayama Imperial Villa and Nasu Imperial Villa.

The Imperial Guard also maintains a 14 horse mounted police unit for use by guards of honour at state ceremonies. In addition to their security duties, the Imperial Guard is also responsible for fire-fighting within the grounds of the Palace, and maintains fire engines and trained staff of this purpose.

The NPA Imperial Guards wear a dark blue or a blue-grey police uniform with white gloves while on duty with peaked caps for public duties activities. They also wear white pistol belts, lanyards, helmets, boot laces or leggings. They carry police rank insignia in their shoulder boards.

Gallery

See also
Bodyguard
Imperial guard
Manchukuo Imperial Guards
Imperial Japanese Army

References

 Madej, W. Victor, Japanese Armed Forces Order of Battle, 1937-1945 [2 vols] Allentown, PA: 1981

External links

 Official NPA IG page

Former guards regiments
Guards Divisions of Japan
Police units of the National Police Agency (Japan)
Military history of Japan
Military units and formations established in 1867
Military units and formations of the Imperial Japanese Army
Royal guards